Red beans and rice is an emblematic dish of Louisiana Creole cuisine (not originally of Cajun cuisine) traditionally made on Mondays with Kidney beans, vegetables (bell pepper, onion, and celery), spices (thyme, cayenne pepper, and bay leaf) and pork bones as left over from Sunday dinner, cooked together slowly in a pot and served over rice. Meats such as ham, sausage (most commonly andouille), and tasso ham are also frequently used in the dish. The dish is customary – ham was traditionally a Sunday meal and Monday was washday. A pot of beans could sit on the stove and simmer while the women were busy scrubbing clothes.  The dish is now fairly common throughout the Southeast. Similar dishes are common in Latin American cuisine, including moros y cristianos, gallo pinto and feijoada.

When the Haitian Revolution ended and the First Empire of Haiti was established in 1804, thousands of refugees from the revolution, both whites and free people of color (affranchis or gens de couleur libres), fled to New Orleans, often bringing African slaves with them, doubling the city's population. They also introduced such Haitian specialties as the red beans and rice and Chayote (or called mirliton; a pear-shaped vegetable) to the Louisiana Creole cuisine.

Red beans and rice is one of the few New Orleans-style dishes to be commonly served both in people's homes and in restaurants. Many neighborhood restaurants and even schools continue to serve it as a Monday lunch or dinner special, usually with a side order of cornbread and either smoked sausage or a pork chop. While Monday washdays are largely a thing of the past, red beans remain a staple for large gatherings such as Super Bowl and Mardi Gras parties. Indeed, red beans and rice is very much part of the New Orleans identity. New Orleanian Louis Armstrong's favorite food was red beans and rice – the musician would sign letters "Red Beans and Ricely Yours, Louis Armstrong". In 1965, the R&B instrumental group Booker T. & the M.G.'s wrote and recorded a song titled "Red Beans and Rice" that was originally a B-side but later became popular in its own right.

The similar vegetarian dish rajma chawal (which translates literally to red beans and rice) is popular in North India. Red beans and rice is also a dietary staple in Central America, where it is known as arroz con habichuelas. The dish is popular in Cuban, Puerto Rican, Dominican, Haitian and Jamaican cuisine as well.

See also

 Cuisine of New Orleans
 Hoppin' John
 Rajma
 List of legume dishes
 List of regional dishes of the United States
 List of rice dishes
 List of sausage dishes

References

External links

 Beans and Rice – Southern U.S. Cuisine
 New Orleans Red Beans and Rice – The Gumbo Pages
 How To Make Red Beans and Rice Video – Cookbook Man

American rice dishes
Cuisine of New Orleans
Sausage dishes
Food combinations
Soul food
Louisiana Creole cuisine
American legume dishes